The 1981 World Games were the first World Games, an international multi-sport event, and were held in Santa Clara, California, United States.  The games featured sports that were not included in the Olympics, including tug-of-war, racquetball, baseball and softball, artistic roller skating, roller hockey, roller speed skating, finswimming, karate, women's water polo, bowling, bodybuilding, waterskiing, casting, badminton, trampoline, powerlifting and taekwondo.  Best estimates for attendance figures were that about 80,000 spectators witnessed the first World Games.

Implementation
The World Games Council was formed independently of the International Olympic Committee (IOC) and adopted policies designed to avoid problems that had plagued the Olympic Games for several decades. For example, construction of new facilities was not required or encouraged. Any flags displayed at ceremonies and Games sites were limited to the flags of the participating sports federations. No national anthems were played nor national flags displayed.  Athletes entered the opening ceremonies grouped by sport under individual federation banners rather than by country. Athletes also were housed according to sport. The respective sport federations paid for each athlete's housing, food and airfare.

The decision to stage World Games I was finalized in January, 1981. The organizing efforts were seriously set back when the Games' promotions agency, Global Sports Management of New York, pulled out in the final months. "It's a humble beginning to what we think is going to be a hard-earned, but successful and regularly-held international event. It's a miracle it is taking place at all," said World Games I promotions and sales coordinator Kent Hertenrath.

Kim Un-yong, president of the World Games executive committee, opened the Games with a brief address.  “Our theme is sport for the sake of sport and a total disregard for where an athlete comes from,” said Kim. Casey Conrad, executive director of the President’s Council on Physical Fitness, represented U.S. President Ronald Reagan, who had survived an assassination attempt four months earlier, in greeting the athletes. Governor of California Jerry Brown had planned to attend the opening ceremonies. But that summer, when Mediterranean fruit flies were discovered in the Santa Clara Valley, Brown withdrew to focus on emergency eradication efforts.

The Soviet Union had been invited to send athletes but, in the aftermath of the boycotted 1980 Summer Olympics in Moscow, instead worked to prevent the competition from ever occurring. An event-day official of the casting governing body said that it had located the casting venue on land, which was preferred by the eastern bloc nations, instead of on water, as was the usual practice, in a failed effort to encourage their participation (personal communication, August 1, 1981). Games secretary-general Don Porter said that some of the problems encountered in the first World Games were created by the International Olympic Committee, especially the eastern bloc countries. Porter said that the national Olympic committees of these countries, as well as the IOC, had intensely pressured the World Games.  He stated, “I think the International Olympic Committee is very concerned about World Games. We’re not competing with the Olympic Games. We support the Olympic movement.”

In fact, the World Games were organized to welcome both Olympic and non-Olympic sports. The sport governing bodies that were members of the World Games Council desired to be accepted eventually into the Olympic Games. Looking to the future, the Council sought to rule out the potential for the IOC to deny a sport’s Olympic acceptance based on an exclusion of the Olympic sports from the World Games program.  Therefore, the World Games Council encouraged the participation of the sport federations of the Olympic Games.

Indeed, the Olympic sport of boxing was to have been contested in these games and was featured on organizers' promotional materials.  However, AIBA withdrew the sport from the program in the weeks before the opening of the games because of IOC disapproval.  Don Porter stated that, according to the president of AIBA, Don Hall, the IOC threatened to exclude boxing from the 1984 Los Angeles Olympics if AIBA participated in the World Games.

In the morning after the close of these Games, U.S. air traffic controllers went on a nationwide strike, leaving some athletes temporarily stranded.

As for the competition, Games officials expressed great satisfaction. Kim said, "The important thing was the competition, and in that regard, the Games were a big success." Kim presented the city of Santa Clara with the first official Games flag.

The executive director of World Games I, John Bragg, envisioned more than 50 sports participating in future events.  "[H]opefully we will set the trend for many World Games to come. ... ," he said. "People here are beginning to realize that this is not just another competition.  We could really revolutionize and clean out some of the negative aspects of international sports."  At the time, the World Games Council planned to hold the Games every two years and received presentations during the 1981 Games from prospective cities to host the 1983 edition, with London said to be the front-runner.

Participants
58 nations sent athletes to the first World Games. The People’s Republic of China was the only communist country represented. (Poland was expected but evidently did not show.) China had not participated in a summer international multi-sport competition since the 1936 Summer Olympics. China participated only in badminton, capturing four of the five gold medals.

World records in waterskiing and powerlifting highlighted the first weekend of competition. Ana Maria Carrasco of Venezuela broke her own world record in waterskiing tricks. In the 100 kg class in powerlifting, Jim Cash of the U.S. set world records in both dead lift and total lift.

Two athletes each won four individual gold medals in these games: Steve Rajeff of the U.S. in casting and Juergen Kolenda of West Germany in finswimming. Tom Peterson of the U.S., in roller speed skating, and Anne-Marie Rouchon of France, in finswimming, won three each.

Sports
For seven World Games sports, according to their federation presidents at the time, the strongest competition ever held in those individual events was fielded at these Games.  104 titles were awarded in 16 sports, including one belatedly designated an "invitational" or demonstration sport.  An invitational sport program did not exist at the time. An agreement was reached with FINA in the lead-up to the games not to allow women's water polo athletes to march in the opening ceremony, to assuage the displeasure of the International Olympic Committee (IOC) for its being included in the program.

 as invitational sport

Medal table
The medal tally during the first World Games follows. The United States was at the top of the final medal table.

 Two bronze medals were awarded in each badminton (5), karate kumite (7) and taekwondo (10) event. No bronze medals were awarded in 8 of the 9 powerlifting events and the women's synchronized trampoline event. No silver medal was awarded in one powerlifting event. In women's individual trampoline, Canada and USA tied for the silver medal; thus no bronze medal was awarded.
 The mixed badminton title was won by a pair of players from Sweden and Great Britain.  Both nations are counted as having won a gold medal.

Calendar

Gallery
IWGA World Games I gallery of photos here.

References

External links
 Official Website of the IWGA

 
1981
1981 in multi-sport events
1981 in American sports
International sports competitions hosted by the United States
Sports competitions in Santa Clara, California
International sports competitions in California
1981 in sports in California
Multi-sport events in the United States
July 1981 sports events in the United States
August 1981 sports events in the United States